"Little Things" is a 19th-century poem by Julia Abigail Fletcher Carney, written in Boston, Massachusetts.

History
In 1845, when studying phonography in Stephen Pearl Andrews' and Augustus F. Boyle's class, Boston, Carney was asked to give an impromptu exercise on the blackboard. Only ten minutes were allowed, and in that time, she wrote the first verse of "Little Things". It became a favorite of children in Sunday school exhibitions from that time on, and was recited and sung thousands of times. It was first published in a Sunday school paper, Gospel Teacher (renamed, Myrtle). 

Soon after her phonographic poem was published, it appeared in the Methodist Sunday-School Advocate, with an additional verse about missionary pennies, to which she laid no claim. 

This poem came to be published uncredited as a children's rhyme and hymn in many 19th century magazines and books, sometimes attributed to Ebenezer Cobham Brewer, Daniel Clement Colesworthy, or Frances S. Osgood, but the earliest publications of it clearly are those of Carney. A later final verse read:

This was quoted in Hanson's Our Woman Workers: Biographical Sketches of Women Eminent in the Universalist Church for Literary, Philanthropic and Christian Work (1881) These were the final words of the poem in the original publication, but later versions published anonymously by other authors appended various additions to this. It has also often appeared credited to Carney in a variant form:

Cultural reference
"Little Things" was parodied by Gelett Burgess in his poem "Tidiness" in Goops and How to Be Them, A Manual of Manners for Polite Infants (1908):

Notes

References

Attribution

Bibliography
 
 

1845 poems
American poems